As the positive integer  becomes larger and larger, the value  becomes arbitrarily close to . We say that "the limit of the sequence  equals ."

In mathematics, the limit of a sequence is the value that the terms of a sequence "tend to", and is often denoted using the  symbol (e.g.). If such a limit exists, the sequence is called convergent. A sequence that does not converge is said to be divergent. The limit of a sequence is said to be the fundamental notion on which the whole of mathematical analysis ultimately rests.

Limits can be defined in any metric or topological space, but are usually first encountered in the real numbers.

History
The Greek philosopher Zeno of Elea is famous for formulating paradoxes that involve limiting processes.

Leucippus, Democritus, Antiphon, Eudoxus, and Archimedes developed the method of exhaustion, which uses an infinite sequence of approximations to determine an area or a volume. Archimedes succeeded in summing what is now called a geometric series.

Grégoire de Saint-Vincent gave the first definition of limit (terminus) of a geometric series in his work Opus Geometricum (1647): "The terminus of a progression is the end of the series, which none progression can reach, even not if she is continued in infinity, but which she can approach nearer than a given segment."

Newton dealt with series in his works on Analysis with infinite series (written in 1669, circulated in manuscript, published in 1711), Method of fluxions and infinite series (written in 1671, published in English translation in 1736, Latin original published much later) and Tractatus de Quadratura Curvarum (written in 1693, published in 1704 as an Appendix to his Optiks). In the latter work, Newton considers the binomial expansion of (x + o)n, which he then linearizes by taking the limit as o tends to 0.

In the 18th century, mathematicians such as Euler succeeded in summing some divergent series by stopping at the right moment; they did not much care whether a limit existed, as long as it could be calculated. At the end of the century, Lagrange in his Théorie des fonctions analytiques (1797) opined that the lack of rigour precluded further development in calculus. Gauss in his etude of hypergeometric series (1813) for the first time rigorously investigated the conditions under which a series converged to a limit.

The modern definition of a limit (for any ε there exists an index N so that ...) was given by Bernard Bolzano (Der binomische Lehrsatz, Prague 1816, which was little noticed at the time), and by Karl Weierstrass in the 1870s.

Real numbers

Examples

If   for constant c, then .
If , then .
If  when  is even, and  when  is odd, then . (The fact that  whenever  is odd is irrelevant.)
Given any real number, one may easily construct a sequence that converges to that number by taking decimal approximations. Note that the decimal representation  is the limit of the previous sequence, defined by 
Finding the limit of a sequence is not always obvious. The squeeze theorem is often useful in the establishment of such limits.

Definition
We call  the limit of the sequence , which is written
, or 
,

if the following condition holds:
For each real number , there exists a natural number  such that, for every natural number , we have .

In other words, for every measure of closeness , the sequence's terms are eventually that close to the limit. The sequence  is said to converge to or tend to the limit .

Symbolically, this is:
.

A sequence that has zero as its limit is sometimes called a null sequence.

Illustration

Properties
Some other important properties of limits of real sequences include the following:
When it exists, the limit of a sequence is unique.
Limits of sequences behave well with respect to the usual arithmetic operations. If  and  exists, then

 provided 

For any continuous function f, if  exists, then  exists too. In fact, any real-valued function f is continuous if and only if it preserves the limits of sequences (though this is not necessarily true when using more general notions of continuity).

A sequence is convergent if and only if every subsequence is convergent.
If every subsequence of a sequence has its own subsequence which converges to the same point, then the original sequence converges to that point.

These properties are extensively used to prove limits, without the need to directly use the cumbersome formal definition. For example, once it is proven that , it becomes easy to show—using the properties above—that  (assuming that ).

Infinite limits

A sequence  is said to tend to infinity, written
, or 
,
if the following holds:
For every real number , there is a natural number  such that for every natural number , we have ; that is, the sequence terms are eventually larger than any fixed .

Symbolically, this is:
.

Similarly, we say a sequence tends to minus infinity, written
, or
,
if the following holds:
For every real number , there is a natural number  such that for every natural number , we have ; that is, the sequence terms are eventually smaller than any fixed .

Symbolically, this is:
.

If a sequence tends to infinity or minus infinity, then it is divergent. However, a divergent sequence need not tend to plus or minus infinity, and the sequence  provides one such example.

Metric spaces

Definition

A point  of the metric space  is the limit of the sequence  if:
For each real number , there is a natural number  such that, for every natural number , we have .

Symbolically, this is:
.

Properties

When it exists, the limit of a sequence is unique, as distinct points are separated by some positive distance, so for  less than half this distance, sequence terms cannot be within a distance  of both points.

For any continuous function f, if  exists, then . In fact, a function f is continuous if and only if it preserves the limits of sequences.

Cauchy sequences

A Cauchy sequence is a sequence whose terms ultimately become arbitrarily close together, after sufficiently many initial terms have been discarded. The notion of a Cauchy sequence is important in the study of sequences in metric spaces, and, in particular, in real analysis. One particularly important result in real analysis is the Cauchy criterion for convergence of sequences: a sequence of real numbers is convergent if and only if it is a Cauchy sequence. This remains true in other complete metric spaces.

Topological spaces

Definition

Properties

In a Hausdorff space, limits of sequences are unique whenever they exist.

Hyperreal numbers
The definition of the limit using the hyperreal numbers formalizes the intuition that for a "very large" value of the index, the corresponding term is "very close" to the limit. More precisely, a real sequence  tends to L if for every infinite hypernatural H, the term  is infinitely close to L (i.e., the difference  is infinitesimal). Equivalently, L is the standard part of :
.

Thus, the limit can be defined by the formula
.
where the limit exists if and only if the righthand side is independent of the choice of an infinite H.

Sequence of more than one index

Sometimes one may also consider a sequence with more than one index, for example, a double sequence . This sequence has a limit  if it becomes closer and closer to  when both n and m becomes very large.

Example

If   for constant c, then .
If , then .
If , then the limit does not exist. Depending on the relative "growing speed" of n and m, this sequence can get closer to any value between 0 and 1.

Definition
We call  the double limit of the sequence , written
, or 
,

if the following condition holds:
For each real number , there exists a natural number  such that, for every pair of natural numbers , we have .
In other words, for every measure of closeness , the sequence's terms are eventually that close to the limit. The sequence  is said to converge to or tend to the limit .

Symbolically, this is:
.

Note that the double limit is different from taking limit in n first, and then in m. The latter is known as iterated limit. Given that both the double limit and the iterated limit exists, they have the same value. However, it is possible that one of them exist but the other does not.

Infinite limits

A sequence  is said to tend to infinity, written
, or 
,
if the following holds:
For every real number , there is a natural number  such that for every pair of natural numbers , we have ; that is, the sequence terms are eventually larger than any fixed .

Symbolically, this is:
.

Similarly, a sequence  tends to minus infinity, written
, or 
,
if the following holds:
For every real number , there is a natural number  such that for every pair of natural numbers , we have ; that is, the sequence terms are eventually smaller than any fixed .

Symbolically, this is:
.

If a sequence tends to infinity or minus infinity, then it is divergent. However, a divergent sequence need not tend to plus or minus infinity, and the sequence  provides one such example.

Pointwise limits and uniform limits

For a double sequence , we may take limit in one of the indices, say, to obtain a single sequence . In fact, there are two possible meanings when taking this limit. The first one is called pointwise limit, denoted

, or
,

which means:

For each real number  and each fixed natural number , there exists a natural number  such that, for every natural number , we have .

Symbolically, this is:
.

The second one is called uniform limit, denoted

,
,
, or
,

which means:

For each real number , there exists a natural number  such that, for every natural number  and for every natural number , we have .

Symbolically, this is:
.

Hence, one can easily see that uniform convergence is a stronger property than pointwise convergence: the existence of uniform limit implies the existence and equality of pointwise limit:

If  uniformly, then  pointwise.

Iterated limit

For a double sequence , we may take limit in one of the indices, say, to obtain a single sequence , and then take limit in the other index, namely , to get a number . Symbolically,
.

This limit is known as iterated limit of the double sequence. Note that the order of taking limits may affect the result, i.e.,

 in general.

A sufficient condition of equality is given by the Moore-Osgood theorem, which requires the limit  to be uniform in m.

See also

 Limit point
 Subsequential limit
 Limit superior and limit inferior
 Limit of a function
 Limit of a sequence of functions
 Limit of a sequence of sets
 Limit of a net
 Pointwise convergence
 Uniform convergence
 Modes of convergence

Notes

Proofs

References

  
  
 Courant, Richard (1961). "Differential and Integral Calculus Volume I", Blackie & Son, Ltd., Glasgow.
 Frank Morley and James Harkness A treatise on the theory of functions  (New York: Macmillan, 1893)

External links
 
 A history of the calculus, including limits

Limits (mathematics)
Sequences and series